William McLeod (4 June 1887–1959) was an English footballer who played in the Football League for Leeds City, Lincoln City and Notts County.

References

1887 births
1959 deaths
English footballers
Association football forwards
English Football League players
Hebburn Argyle F.C. players
Peebles Rovers F.C. players
Lincoln City F.C. players
Leeds City F.C. players
Notts County F.C. players
Doncaster Rovers F.C. players